USS LSM-20 was a  of the United States Navy, commissioned at Brown Shipyards in Houston, Texas, on 16 June 1944. During WWII, she operated in the Pacific. On 5 December 1944, the vessel sunk after she was hit by a Japanese kamikaze in the Surigao Strait in the Philippines. Five sailors were killed and another nine were wounded.

References

Landing ships of the United States Navy
1944 ships